Sonam Gyatso (1543–1588) was the first to be named Dalai Lama, although the title was retrospectively given to his two predecessors.

He was born near Lhasa in 1543 and was recognised as the reincarnation of Gendun Gyatso and subsequently enthroned at Drepung Monastery by Panchen Sonam Dragpa, who became his tutor. Panchen Sonam Dragpa was the 15th Ganden Tripa and his texts still serve as the core curriculum for many Gelugpa monasteries. The third Dalai Lama studied at Drepung Monastery and became its abbot. His reputation spread quickly and the monks at Sera Monastery also recognised him as their abbot.

According to Sumpa Khenpo, the great Gelug scholar, he also studied some Nyingmapa tantric doctrines.

When one of Tibet's kings, who had been supported by the Kagyupa, died in 1564, Sonam Gyatso presided over his funeral. His political power, and that of the Gelugpas, became dominant in Tibet by the 1570s.

Origin of the title "Dalai Lama"
The title "Dalai Lama" was first bestowed by Altan Khan upon Sonam Gyatsho in 1578, after Altan Khan became Shunyi Wang (顺义王) of China in 1571. Title "Dalai Lama" was derived from the Mongolian Dalai-yin qan (or Dalaiin khan) one.

Since the time of Genghis Khan, only people who were of his royal lineage were allowed to rule Mongolia. This frustrated many would-be rulers who were not of this line. Altan Khan was the most destructive of these usurpers. He perceived that through the Buddhist faith he could gain legitimacy by claiming to be a reincarnation of Kublai Khan.

Altan Khan chose the Gelug order of Tibetan Buddhism (founded by Tsongkhapa, 1357–1419). In 1577 he invited the leader of this order, Sonam Gyatsho, to come to Mongolia and teach his people.

Sonam Gyatsho proclaimed Altan Khan to be the reincarnation of Kublai Khan, and in return, Altan Khan gave the title Dalai Lama to Sonam Gyatsho. Altan Khan posthumously awarded the title to his two predecessors, making Sonam Gyatsho the 3rd Dalai Lama.

Altan Khan and the conversion of Mongolia
He was anti-shamanist.

Sonam Gyatso, a monk of the Gelugpa (Yellow Hat) school of Buddhism, was responsible for finding a foreign patron for Gelugpa institutions. He found this patron in the Altan Khan.

Altan Khan first invited the 3rd Dalai Lama to Tümed in 1569, but apparently the Dalai Lama refused to go and sent a disciple again, who reported back to the Dalai Lama about the great opportunity to spread Buddhist teachings throughout Mongolia. In 1573 Altan Khan took some Tibetan Buddhist monks prisoner.

Altan Khan invited the 3rd Dalai Lama to Mongolia again and embraced Tibetan Buddhism. After some hesitation, with followers begging him not to go, Sonam Gyatso's party set out and was met at Ahrik Karpatang in Mongolia where a specially prepared camp had been set up to receive them. Thousands of animals were given to him as offerings and five hundred horsemen had been sent to escort him to Altan Khan's court. When they arrived there, they were greeted by over ten thousand people including Altan Khan dressed in a white robe to symbolize his devotion to the Dharma.

Some sources say this first meeting between Sonam Gyatso and Altan Khan took place in Amdo or near (lake) Kokonor, rather than in Mongolia itself. This inconsistency may be due to some confusion in the texts or the existence of alternative accounts of this important meeting in the Tibetan literature. Besides, while Altan Khan bestowed the title Dalai on Sonam Gyatso, some claim that the latter gave the title of Brahma, the king of religion, to Altan Khan.

Altan Khan had Thegchen Chonkhor, Mongolia's first monastery, built, and a massive program of translating Tibetan texts into Mongolian was commenced. Within 50 years most Mongols had become Buddhist, with tens of thousands of monks, who were members of the Gelug order, loyal to the Dalai Lama.

Sonam Gyatso's message was that the time had come for Mongolia to embrace Buddhism, that from that time on there should be no more animal sacrifices, the images of the old gods were to be destroyed, there must be no taking of life, animal or human, military action must be given up and the immolation of women on the funeral pyres of their husbands must be abolished. He also secured an edict abolishing the Mongol custom of blood-sacrifices. "These and many other such laws were set forth by Gyalwa Sonam Gyatso and were instituted by Altan Khan."

The Third Dalai Lama publicly announced that he was a reincarnation of Phagpa, while Altan Khan was a reincarnation of Kublai Khan and they had come together again to cooperate in propagating the Buddhist religion.

The alliance with the Mongols would later prove instrumental in establishing the Gelug order as the rulers of Tibet during the reign of the Great Fifth Dalai Lama.

Altan Khan died in 1582, only four years after meeting with the Third Dalai Lama. According to legend, Abtai Sain Khan was given a Buddha relic by the third Dalai Lama to help the spread of Buddhism.

Altan Khan was succeeded by his son Sengge Düüreng who continued to diligently support Buddhism, and two years later the 3rd Dalai Lama made another visit to Mongolia. On his way, he founded the monastery of Kumbum at the birthplace of the great teacher and reformer, Je Tsongkhapa.

Gyalwa Sonam Gyatso had also founded Lithang monastery in Eastern Tibet, as well as the small monastery Phende Lekshe Ling in either 1564 or 1565, which became known as Namgyal in 1571, the personal monastery of all the subsequent Dalai Lamas.  By 1585 he was back in Mongolia and converted more Mongol princes and their tribes.

In October of 1587, Gyalwa Sonam Gyatso was promoted to Duǒ Er Zhǐ Chàng (朵儿只唱) by the emperor of China, and seal of authority was given. 

The Dalai Lama was again invited to visit the Ming emperor, and this time he accepted but fell ill and died (in 1588, age 45) in Mongolia while returning to Tibet.

Altan Khan's great-grandson, Yonten Gyatso, was selected as the 4th Dalai Lama.

"To others give the victory and the spoils; The loss and defeat, take upon oneself" — Sonam Gyatso.

References

Bibliography
 Essence of Refined Gold by the Third Dalai Lama: with related texts by the Second and Seventh Dalai Lamas. (1978) Translated by Glenn H. Mullin. Tushita Books, Dharamsala, H.P., India.

Further reading
 Mullin, Glenn H. (2001). The Fourteen Dalai Lamas: A Sacred Legacy of Reincarnation, pp. 129–163. Clear Light Publishers. Santa Fe, New Mexico. .

External links
 tbrc.org: bsod nams rgya mtsho
 Sönam Gyatso: 16th or 17th century gilt copper portrait sculpture in the Oriental Collections of the State Hermitage Museum in St. Petersburg, Russia: https://web.archive.org/web/20130105184636/http://www.hermitagemuseum.org/html_En/03/hm3_5_7a.html

1543 births
1588 deaths
3
16th-century Tibetan people